Robert Shannon is a boxer.

Robert Shannon may also refer to:

Rab Shannon (born 1966), Scottish footballer
Robert D. Shannon, American Chemist
Robert R. Shannon, professor of optical sciences
Robert V. Shannon, professor of otolaryngology

See also

Bob Shannon (disambiguation)